The United States Senate special election in Ohio of 1954 was held on November 2, 1954 to complete the unexpired term of late Senator Robert A. Taft, who died in office on July 31, 1953. Interim Senator Thomas A. Burke ran to complete the term in office but was narrowly defeated by U.S. Representative George Bender.

Background
On July 31, 1953, incumbent Republican Senator Robert A. Taft died in office. His term was scheduled to expire in 1957. Governor Frank Lausche appointed Thomas A. Burke, the Democratic Mayor of Cleveland, to fill his seat until a successor could be duly elected.

The special election was scheduled for November 2, 1954, concurrent with the regularly scheduled state and federal elections. Burke ran to complete the term.

Republican primary

Candidates
George H. Bender, U.S. Representative from Chagrin Falls
William B. Saxbe, State Representative from Mechanicsburg

Results

General election

See also 
 1954 United States Senate elections

References

1954
Ohio
United States Senate
Ohio 1954
Ohio 1954
United States Senate 1954